Hen Mazzig is an Israeli writer, speaker, and activist. He is a senior fellow at the Tel Aviv Institute.

Mazzig is of Mizrahi Jewish (Iraqi Jewish and Tunisian Jewish) descent. He is a Zionist. Mazzig was named one of the Top 50 NYC Jewish LGBTQ+ Influencers.

Activism 
In August 2020, Mazzig started a viral movement, #JewishPrivilege, with Jews telling personal stories of discrimination and abuse. In November 2020, Mazig criticized a student BDS resolution passed at San Francisco State University. In December 2020, Mazzig spoke to the New South Wales Jewish Board of Deputies, commemorating the plight of 850,000 Jews who were expelled from Arab lands. He was a panelist, along with Arizona State Rep. Alma Hernandez, discussing antisemitism.

Mazzig has written op-ed pieces that have been featured in The LA Times, The Vancouver Sun, and The Yonkers Tribune among others.

References 

Israeli gay writers
Israeli male writers
Israeli activists
Year of birth missing (living people)
Living people
Zionists
Gay Jews
Israeli people of Iraqi-Jewish descent
Israeli people of Tunisian-Jewish descent
21st-century Mizrahi Jews
Israeli people of Berber descent
Anti-BDS activists

Zionist activists
Activists against antisemitism